Yoav Eliasi (born November 22, 1977), commonly known by his stage name The Shadow (Ha-Tzel) is an Israeli rapper, blogger, and right-wing political activist. He was part of the roster of artists on the label TACT Records.

Background
Yoav Eliasi was born in Safed, Israel. His parents are of both Ashkenazi Jewish (Romanian-Jewish) and Mizhahi Jewish (Persian-Jewish) descent. His family relocated to Tel Aviv two years later. By his teenage years he had formed a deep bond with Kobi "Subliminal" Shimoni, and the two began performing together at hip-hop shows.

After finishing his mandatory military service in the IDF, he decided to stay on. This is where his rap name allegedly derives from. The official TACT Records profile says that Yoav Eliasi was in an elite undercover unit where he could not show his face, though in an interview with Yehoram Gaon on Channel 1, Eliasi claims that he was a M'faked Mishma'at ("Discipline Officer").

He was featured with Kobi "Subliminal" Shimoni and their colleague, Tamer Nafar in the documentary Channels of Rage.

In July 2014, Eliasi was a central organiser of a right-wing confrontation on a demonstration by Israeli left-wing anti-war protesters opposing Operation Protective Edge against Gaza. An editorial in the left-leaning Haaretz described him as  "the dangerous product of incessant incitement by extreme right-wing elements." 

In 2014, he officiated a wedding ceremony in Israel of two gay men.

Discography

Studio albums

Solo
 Lo Sam Zain (Hebrew: לא שם זין, "Doesn't put a dick"   Non-literal translations: "Don't give a shit" or "Don't give a fuck" or "Don't give a damn" [official translation by TACT] ) (2008)

With Subliminal
 Ha'Or Ve'HaTzel (Hebrew: האור והצל, "The Light and the Shadow") 2002

With TACT (Tel Aviv City Team)
 TACT All-Stars (Hebrew: תאקט אול סטארז, "TACT All-Stars") (2004)

Singles

Solo

From Lo Sam Zain
 Meantezet 2007 (Hebrew: מענטזת 2007, "Moves Her Ass 2007") (2007)

With TACT

Non-album singles
 Shir Shel Rega Ehad (Hebrew: שיר של רגע אחד, "Song of One Moment") (2005)

From TACT All-Stars
 Hineni/Viens Ici (Hebrew: הנני/VIENS ICI, "Here I am") (2004)
 Lama (Hebrew: למה, "Why?") (2004)
 Prahim ba'Kaneh (Hebrew: פרחים בקנה, "Flowers in the Turrets") (2004)
 Peace in the Middle East (Hebrew: שלום במזרח התיכון, "Peace in the Middle East") (2004)

Collaborations
Ha'Tzel has worked with Israel house duo "Knob" on a re-work of Haddaway's song "What Is Love".

References

Related links
 TACT Records site

1977 births
Living people
Israeli rappers
Jewish rappers
People from Safed
Israeli people of Iranian-Jewish descent
Israeli people of Romanian-Jewish descent
Israeli Ashkenazi Jews
Israeli Sephardi Jews
Israeli Mizrahi Jews
Israeli activists
Far-right politics in Israel